Ángel Ximénez Puente Genil is a team of handball based in Puente Genil, Spain. It plays in Liga ASOBAL.

History

The association was founded in 1984. Its predecessor was the Puente Genil OJE association. From 1987 to 1990, from 2009 to 2010 and from 2011 to 2013, the team belonged to the second division, and since 2013 they have been continuously in the Spanish first division, Liga ASOBAL.

Crest, colours, supporters

Kits

Team

Current squad 

Squad for the 2022–23 season

Technical staff
 Head coach:  Francisco Bustos
 Assistant coach:  Agustín Avilés Baena
 Fitness coach:  Juanje Leiva
 Physiotherapist:  Jesús Morales

Transfers

Transfers for the 2022–23 season

Joining 
  Henrik Nordlander (GK) from  IFK Ystad HK
  Gonçalo Ribeiro (CB) from  EHV Aue
  Martín Nicolás Jung (CB) from  CBM Córdoba
  Andrei Buzle (LB) from  CS Minaur Baia Mare
  Erekle Arsenashvili (LP) from  Sporting CP
  Javier Muñoz (RW) from  Saran Loiret HB

Leaving 
  João Pedro Silva (CB) to  Dinamo București
  Felipe Borges (LW) to  BM Zaragoza
  Jaka Spiljak (LB) to  Anorthosis Famagusta
  Borivaje Djukic (LB) to  CSM Oradea
  Michal Martin Konečný (GK) to  SC Ferlach
  Mihajlo Mitić (RB) to  Bidasoa Irún
  Sean Corning (RW) to  CB Pozoblanco
  Antonio Pineda Moyano (LW) on loan at  CBM Córdoba
  Álvaro Muñoz Lozano (RB) on loan at  Cordoplas BM La Salle

Previous Squads

Season by season

EHF ranking

Former club members

Notable former players

  Victor Alonso (2018–2020)
  Rafael Baena (2014–2015)
  Javier García Rubio (2018–)
  Khalifa Ghedbane (2017–2018)
  Leonardo Domenech de Almeida (2016–2019)
  Felipe Borges (2021–2022)
  Matheus Dias (2017–2019)
  Anderson Mollino (2020–2021)
  João Pedro Silva (2020–2022)
  Flávio Fortes (2015-2016)
  Délcio Pina (2021)
  Allahkaram Esteki (2019–2020)
  Chen Pomeranz (2021–)
  Atsushi Mekaru (2016-2017)
  Gonçalo Ribeiro (2022-)
  Ruslan Dashko (2019–2020)
  Mikhail Revin (2016–2018)
  Stanislav Demovič (2013-2014)
  Henrik Nordlander (2022-)
  Gabriel Chaparro (2018-2019)

Former coaches

References

External links
 
 

Sports teams in Andalusia
Spanish handball clubs
Handball clubs established in 1984
1984 establishments in Spain
Province of Córdoba (Spain)